Santa Ana is a district in the City of Manila, Philippines. It is located on the city's southeast, bordering the cities of Mandaluyong and Makati in the east, the city districts of Paco and Pandacan in the west, and Santa Mesa in the north. It is part of the 6th congressional district of Manila, with thirty-five barangays. Based on the 2020 national census, the Philippine Statistics Authority reports that the district has a population of 203,598.

Etymology
When the Catholic missionaries asked the natives the name of the area, they pointed to the banks of the Pasig River. The locals responded with "sapa" or the Tagalog word for marshes, thinking they were referring to the terrain instead of the place name.

The Franciscan missionaries henceforth dedicated the district to Saint Anne, the mother of the Blessed Virgin Mary, and called it Santa Ana de Sapa ("Saint Anne of the Marshes").

History

The original name of Santa Ana before the arrival of the Spanish conquistadors was Namayan, a small settlement whose last recorded rulers were Lakan Tagkan or Lacantagean, and his wife Queen Buwan or Bouan ("Moon"). The Muslim kingdom’s domain stretched from what is now Mandaluyong, Makati, Pasay, and the Manila districts of Pandacan and Pandacan.

The Spaniards established settlements in Santa Ana that served as the seat of Namayan, with the area awarded to the Franciscan missionaries. They were the first to establish a mission beyond the walls of Intramuros, the Spanish colonial seat of power in Manila, in 1578. The church as it stands today was first built in 1720 and is known as the National Shrine of Our Lady of the Abandoned (Nuestra Senora de los Desamparados).

Edmund Roberts visited Santa Ana in 1832, writing about it in his travelogue, Embassy to the Eastern Courts of Cochin-China, Siam, and Muscat.

Barangays
Santa Ana is divided into 35 barangays.

Attractions
The Parish of Our Lady of the Abandoned of Sta.Ana (Nuestra Señora de los Desamparados de Sta.Ana)

The Church of Santa Ana stands on the site of the first Franciscan mission established outside Manila in 1578.  The church was built under the supervision of Fr. Vicente Ingles, OFM. The  cornerstone of the present church was laid on September 12, 1720 by Francisco dela Cuesta, then Archbishop of Manila and Acting Governor General of the Philippines.

in the early 1700s, Father Vicente went to Valencia, Spain. The friar had been very enamored of a famous image of Our Lady that had become a big spiritual attraction in Valencia. The image is now known as “Our Lady of the Abandoned” (in Spanish, Nuestra Señora de los Desamparados).While Father Vicente was in Valencia, in the year 1713 he decided to have a copy made of this image—venerated in Valencia with so much devotion—for Santa Ana Parish, which was in the process of being constructed near Manila. After reverently touching the copy to the original image, the friar brought the new replica image with him to the Philippines in 1717. The image has been venerated in Santa Ana for almost 300 years. In time, the parish became known as Our Lady of the Abandoned Parish, as it is today. But St. Ann, the original patron of the parish, has not been forgotten. Today, a statue of St. Ann with the child Mary at her side still stands in a niche directly above the exquisite image of Our Lady of the Abandoned that Father Vicente brought from Valencia.

Through community-based heritage tourism, the Lola Grande Foundation and Fundacion Santiago, Sta. Ana Manila was declared as a heritage site. This means that one cannot alter or demolish any structure in the area without securing consent from Gemma Cruz Araneta (former Ms. International), Sylvia Lichauco and the Fundacion Santiago. All three must consent before securing any permits since they have the power to revoke permits. They prohibit any business from setting up in the area. Moreover, it is highly discouraged for anyone to buy a house within the heritage zone since one does not have a right to alter the property.

Lichauco Heritage House
The Lichauco House was declared a heritage house and is open to public for viewing. Any school or organization who wishes to visit the house may do so since it operates on public funding. It opens from 8:00am till 5:00pm. Charges are minimal. Any donation may be helpful in maintaining the house since major repairs are necessary to save it from further deterioration.

Pascual Modernist House

The Pascual House is located in 2138 Dr. M.L. Carreon Street, in the district of Santa Ana. Like a number of older, prominent houses in the district, this house enjoys the view of the nearby Pasig River which is located on the east, as well as the Estero de Pandacan farther up on the northeast.

The Pascual House is a modernist style house built in April of 1948. Currently the house is occupied by its second owner, Mr. Rodolfo C. Pascual who bought the property in 1984. Originally the house was owned by Mr. Alejandro Velo. According to its present owner, the house was sometimes used as a shooting area for movies during the 1950s. 

The breeze coming from the Pasig River, as well as the river being the main route for water travel around Manila, resulted in the siting of the houses of wealthy and prominent families during the Spanish period.  These riverside vacation houses has verandas and wide opening to frame the river views as well as catch the breeze. 

The district, even with its glamorous past, after the Second World War eventually fell into disarray, becoming a tightly-packed residential district.  Eventually the old district for vacation houses was mixed with other Architectural styles, which eventually decayed through the years and are now being demolished to give way to modern developments.

Notable features of the house.

The Pascual House was built in the modernist style of architecture. Method of construction is a mixture of reinforced concrete, masonry and wood. Notable feature of the exterior are the 3 reinforced concrete pylons on the façade of the house. The mirador or watchtower is also a notable feature of the exterior that adorns the corner mass of the whole house. Vertical and horizontal design elements complement the whole massing of the house. On the interiors, notable features are the built-in cabinetry, niches and the cove ceilings. All are in stylized geometric form. Granolithic flooring can still be found on the first 3 steps of the stairs and main entrance steps. The whole ground floor is covered in “Machuca” tiles. On the second floor, geometric stylized ventilation panels with the initials of the original owner (AV) embellish the wall partitions. Plumbing fixtures are all original from the 1940s.

Notable people
Panday Pira

References

Sources
"By Sword and Fire: The Destruction of Manila in World War II, 3 February-3 March 1945" by Alphonso J. Aluit (1994) Bookmark, Inc. © 1994 National Commission for Culture and the Arts ISBN 971-569-162-5

Districts of Manila